The 3rd Deauville American Film Festival took place at Deauville, France from September 5 to 11, 1977. The festival was non-competitive in nature and remained so until 1995. This year, festival also paid tributes to Gregory Peck, Vincente Minnelli and Sydney Pollack. Elizabeth Taylor's name was also announced for the tribute but she was unable to come to the festival that year. The festival screened 40 feature films.

Programme

America
America at the Movies by James R. Silke
Handle with Care by Jonathan Demme
Black Sister's Revenge by Jamaa Fanaka
Harlan County, USA by Barbara Kopple
Hollywood Parade by Edward Shaw
In MacArthur Park by Bruce R. Shwartz
Life Goes to the Movies by Mel Stuart
Meanwhile, Back at the Ranch... by Richard Patterson
Rush It by Gary Youngman
Skateboard by Georges Cage
The Baby Maker by James Bridges
The Blank Generation by Amos Poe and Ivan Král 
Unmade Beds by Amos Poe

American cinema overview
Andy Warhol's Bad by Jed Johnson
Dogs by Burt Brinckerhoff
Eraserhead by David Lynch
Goodbye, Franklin High by Mike MacFarland
Kingdom of the Spiders by John "Bud" Cardos
Two Tons of Turquoise to Taos Tonight by Robert Downey Sr.
Rolling Thunder by John Flynn
Ruby by Curtis Harrington
Sybil by Daniel Petrie
The Car by Elliot Silverstein
The Mouse and His Child by Charles Swenson and Fred Wolf
The Savage Bees by Bruce Geller
Through the Looking Glass by Jonas Middleton

Preview
A Little Night Music by Harold Prince
Annie Hall by Woody Allen
Bobby Deerfield by Sydney Pollack
Islands in the Stream by Franklin J. Schaffner
Nasty Habits by Michael Lindsay Hogg
Nickelodeon by Peter Bogdanovich
Ransom by Richard Compton
Shenanigans by Joseph Jacoby
Star Wars by George Lucas
The Kentucky Fried Movie by John Landis
The Great Smokey Roadblock by John Leone
The Late Show by Robert Benton
The Next Man by Richard C. Sarafian
W. C. Fields and Me by Arthur Hiller

Awards
Tributes:
Gregory Peck
Vincente Minnelli 
Sydney Pollack
Lucien Barrière Prize for Literature:
Marc Ullmann

References

External links
 Official site
 Deauville American Film Festival:1977 at Internet Movie Database

Deca
1977 film festivals
Film festivals in France